Expensive Candy is a 2022 Philippine romantic drama film directed by Jason Paul Laxamana and produced by Viva films, starring Julia Barretto and Carlo Aquino. It marks Barretto's first venture into the sexy genre, which was given an R-13 rating by the MTRCB.

Plot
The story follows around finding love in the most unlikely of places and risking everything to pursue it. High school teacher Renato "Toto" Camaya (played by Carlo Aquino) and hooker Candy (played by Julia Barretto) spend a night together and fall in love at first sight.

Toto is determined to win her love and spend as much time with her as he can, even if it means exerting effort or buying her time. Toto is a modest man who leads a simple life. His one and only desire is to be with Candy, and he will stop at nothing to make that happen. Candy, however, has other ideas and doesn't want to be in a committed relationship with Toto.

Cast

Lead casts
Julia Barretto as Candy: a sex worker and Toto's love interest.
Carlo Aquino as Renato "Toto" Camaya: a respected high school teacher who fell in love with Candy.

Supporting casts
Francis Magundayao as Gopez
Andre Yllana as Wiggie
Ashley Diaz as Letlet
Bon Jbeli as Ben
Denise Esteban as Bar Girl
Quinn Carrillo as Angie
Ivan Padilla as Justinian
AJ Muhlach as TJ
Keagan de Jesus as Olan
Aurora Sevilla as Ruth
Marissa Sanchez as Manay Ritz
Marnie Lapus as Yolly
Jobelyn Manuel as Ivy

Production
Jason Paul Laxamana the director of the film said that the storyline for Expensive Candy has been existing since 2015 but was shelved (up until 2022) because it was declined by companies and producers. When Barretto transferred to Viva Films, Laxamana was told that she was in search for a project that would require her to level up as an actress. He then recalled the storyline he crafted a few years back and presented it to Barretto. On November 30, 2021, Laxamana announced in his Instagram account that the film is in the works and is slated for release the following year.

Release

Theatrical run

Expensive Candy premiered on theatres in September 14, 2022. The press conference of the film occurred last August 31, 2022 while the red carpet premiere took place at The Block Cinema of SM North Edsa on September 5, 2022.

Reception

The official full trailer of Expensive Candy was released on August 20, 2022, and was well received by the audience. The trailer garnered over 1.8 million views across all social media platforms in its first 24 hours. On Facebook, it has already accumulated 4.6 million views (including nearly 200,000 likes and reactions) in just 18 days.

On Amazon Prime Video Indonesia, Expensive Candy reached No. 1 on the Top 10 movies list between January 3-9, 2023.

Box office
According to Viva Films, Expensive Candy immediately became the No. 1 movie in the Philippines upon its premiere in September 14, 2022.

Critical response

Manila Bulletin gave the film a positive review, calling it: "alternately entertaining and moving". They also noted and praised Aquino's powerful presence throughout the film, also calling Barretto's performance beautiful and illuminating. Fred Hawson of ABS-CBN News also gave the film a stunning score of 7/10, emphasizing Barretto's stellar performance a level-up from her previous works. Film Circle Reject gave an overall mixed review, stating that "overall, it's just... okay. For fans of Laxamana like me, it's simply nice to see him back working on the genre. But admittedly, this is not his strongest work."

Accolades

References